Currie Lighthouse was built following agitation by Archibald Currie and others for a lighthouse at Currie Harbour, Currie, King Island, Australia in 1879. Planned and fabricated by Chance Brothers in Smethwick, England, it was devised as a -tall square pyramidal truss iron tower with an iron cylinder centred inside, and then shipped to Tasmania to be erected. After an inactive period from 1989 to 1995, the light is now active again. The light characteristic is "Fl. 6 s", i.e. one flash every six seconds. The adjacent keeper's house was turned into a museum in 1980.

See also

 History of Tasmania
 List of lighthouses in Tasmania

Notes

External links

 Australian Maritime Safety Authority

Lighthouses completed in 1879
Lighthouses in Tasmania
Tasmanian Heritage Register